Weymouth Lifeboat Station is the base for Royal National Lifeboat Institution (RNLI) search and rescue operations at Weymouth in Dorset, England. The first lifeboat was stationed in the town in 1869. Since 2002 it has operated a  all-weather lifeboat (ALB) and an  inshore lifeboat (ILB).

History
The Royal National Institution for Preserving Life from Shipwreck (as the RNLI was then known) provided a lifeboat at Portland in 1826 but it was withdrawn in 1851. The Earl of Strafford asked for a lifeboat to be stationed at Weymouth in 1868 and his request was granted when a new RNLI station opened on 26 January the following year. A boathouse was built along with a slipway into harbour. The boathouse was rebuilt in 1921 to allow it to receive a motor lifeboat, although this was not on station until 1924. In 1930 a new Barnett class lifeboat was stationed at Weymouth. This was too large to fit into the boathouse so was kept at moorings in the harbour, an arrangement that continues to this day. In 2003 access to the boat was made easier by the construction of a floating pontoon.

Since 1995 the all-weather lifeboat has been supported by an ILB. This is housed in a separate boathouse built nearer the entrance to the harbour in 1996.

Service awards
The volunteer crews of the RNLI do not expect reward or recognition for their work, but many rescues have been recognised by letters, certificates and medals from the RNLI management. The following are just some of the most notable.

In 1948 three people were rescued from the yacht Mite during an operation that lasted eleven hours. For this Coxswain Frederick Palmer was awarded an RNLI Bronze medal. The following year he received a silver medal and Motor Mechanic James McDermott a bronze medal for their rescue of four people from a steam tug.

The rescue of five crew members from the yacht Dehra resulted in the award of a Bronze Medal to lifeboatman Donald Laker in 1965. Another was awarded in 1972 to Coxswain Alfred Pavey following the rescue of an injured crewman from the yacht Nomis.

On 14 October 1976 the lifeboat put to sea in a hurricane to assist the yacht Latifa and her crew of eight. In charge of the rescue was Second Coxswain Victor Pitman. He did not have a full crew of trained lifeboatmen and so two fishermen volunteered to make the crew up to strength. Pitman was awarded a silver medal and all the crew – both regular volunteers and the fishermen – received recognition for their work that day.

A Bronze Medal was awarded to Coxswain/Mechanic Derek Sargent for leading the rescue on 16 October 1987 of the crew of five from the catamaran Sunbeam Chaser during a storm off Portland Bill.

Description
The 1869 lifeboat station is still used for crew facilities but the space once occupied by the lifeboat between launches is now used as a fund-raising gift shop. It is built from stone and faces the harbour. Above the boat doors is a bay window lookout. At the top of the gable is a date stone carved '1924' to commemorate when the building was modified for the arrival of its first motor lifeboat, the Samuel Oakes. Opposite the boathouse is a metal bridge leading to the floating pontoon where the ALB is moored.

Much closer to the harbour entrance is the boathouse built in 1996. This is a long. Low building that opens immediately onto a wide slipway down which the ILB is pushed on its carriage to reach the water.

Area of operation

Current fleet
  17-32 Ernest and Mabel (Official Number 1261, on station 2002) which is kept moored afloat alongside.
  B-746 Phyl Clare III (on station 1998) which is launched by hand on a slipway.
 Boarding Boat BB-026

Former lifeboats
'ON' is the RNLI's sequential Official Number; 'Op. No.' is the operational number painted onto the boat.

Pulling and sailing lifeboats

Motor lifeboats

Inshore lifeboats

See also
 List of RNLI stations

References

External links

 Official station website
 RNLI station information

Lifeboat stations in Dorset
Buildings and structures in Weymouth, Dorset